Black and White is a Big Finish Productions audio play based on the long-running British science fiction television series Doctor Who.

Plot
The search for the Doctor continues.  The Black TARDIS brings Ace and Aristedes to the setting of the classic, epic, Anglo-Saxon poem, Beowulf.  The White TARDIS brings Hex and Sally to the same location, but sixteen years later.

Cast
Seventh Doctor – Sylvester McCoy
Ace – Sophie Aldred
Hex – Philip Olivier
Captain Aristedes – Maggie O'Neill
Private Sally Morgan- Amy Pemberton
Garundel – Stuart Milligan
Young Beowulf – Michael Rouse
Old Beowulf – Richard Bremmer
Weohstan – John Banks
Wiglaf – James Hayward

Continuity
Aristedes was first heard in the 2010 story, Project Destiny, where she was working for The Forge, just before its destruction.
Sally met the Doctor in the 2011 story House of Blue Fire.  She also features in Project: Nirvana, alongside Captain Aristedes.
The exterior of the TARDIS was rendered white during the events of the 2009 story, The Angel of Scutari.  It remained as such in the stories, Project: Destiny, A Death in the Family, Lurkers at Sunlight's Edge and Protect and Survive.
Ace and Hex discovered that the Doctor was missing at the start of the previous story, Protect and Survive.
The TARDIS with the black exterior was inexplicably seen in a trilogy of solo Seventh Doctor stories, Robophobia, The Doomsday Quatrain and House of Blue Fire, which, for the Doctor, take place between Lurkers at Sunlight's Edge  and Protect and Survive.  It is also in Project: Nirvana, which takes place just before Black and White.
Aristedes recalls unheard adventures with the Doctor and Sally, fighting Elder Gods such as The Animus (encountered by the First Doctor in the television story The Web Planet) and The Great Intelligence (encountered by the Second Doctor in the television stories The Abominable Snowmen and The Web of Fear).  She also mentions The Mi’en Kalarash,  which Sally fought in House of Blue Fire.  Ace recalls her encounter with The Celestial Toymaker in the audio The Magic Mousetrap.
The Fast Return Switch was used in the 1964 First Doctor television story, The Edge of Destruction.  It has also featured in Big Finish audios such as Seasons of Fear and Neverland.
The Doctor is heard in several scenes that take place at other points in time.  He is heard obtaining the Black TARDIS, just after the events in Alaska in Lurkers at Sunlight's Edge.  He is then heard taking it on its first three trips, (Robophobia, The Doomsday Quatrain and House of Blue Fire).  He is also heard recruiting Sally, in a scene taken from the end of House of Blue Fire. And he is heard recruiting Captain Aristedes, just after House of Blue Fire.

Notes
Stuart Milligan previously played U.S. President Richard Nixon in the 2011 Eleventh Doctor television episodes, The Impossible Astronaut and Day of the Moon, as well as Emerson Whytecrag in Lurkers at Sunlight's Edge.
An alternative cover was first released, to conceal the inclusion of the characters Sally and Aristedes.  The actual cover was not revealed until just before the audio's release.

External links
Big Finish Productions – Black and White

References

2012 audio plays
Seventh Doctor audio plays
Works based on Beowulf
Fiction set in the 5th century
Fiction set in 2026